Irène Pusterla (born 21 June 1988 in Mendrisio) is a Swiss long jumper.

Achievements

References

1988 births
Living people
People from Mendrisio
Swiss female long jumpers
Athletes (track and field) at the 2012 Summer Olympics
Olympic athletes of Switzerland
World Athletics Championships athletes for Switzerland
Sportspeople from Ticino